Kachaks (/ kačaci) is a term used for the Albanian bandits active in the late 19th and early 20th century in northern Albania, Montenegro, Kosovo and Macedonia, and later as a term for the militias of Albanian revolutionary organizations against the Kingdom of Serbia (1910–18) Kingdom of Yugoslavia (1918–24), called the "Kaçak movement".

Etymology
The word is derived from Turkish kaçmak for "outlaw".

Background

History

1920–24 Kachak movement
The Committee for the National Defense of Kosovo was created in Shkodër, under Hasan Prishtina, in 1918. The committee organizationally and financially supported the kachaks in Albanian-populated areas of Yugoslavia, in Kosovo and Skopje (the former Kosovo Vilayet). Kachaks were also active around Ohrid and Bitola. On 6 May 1919 the Committee called for a general uprising in Kosovo and other Albanian-inhabited regions in Yugoslavia. The Kachaks were popular among Albanians, and local support to them increased in the 1920s when Hasan Prishtina became a member of the Albanian parliament, Hoxhe Kadriu became Minister of justice, and Bajram Curri became Minister of war (1921). All three were Kosovar Albanians. During this time, Kosovar Albanians under Azem Galica began an armed struggle, also known as the "Kachak movement", a large-scale revolt in Drenica involving around 10,000 people under Galica. The uprising was quelled by the Yugoslav army. Armed conflicts between the Yugoslav army and the Kachaks took place in the years 1920 and 1921, 1923, with a revival in 1924. One of the achievements was the creation of the "neutral zone" around Junik which would serve for jeopardizing the frontier and providing ammunition and other logistical support for the Kachaks.

Legacy
They are widely depicted in Albanian folklore. Albanian collaborationists in Yugoslavia during World War II were also known as Kachaks .

Notable people
Bajram Curri (1862–1925)
Azem Galica (1889–1924)
Qerime Shotë Galica (1895–1927) 
Zef Kol Ndoka (1883-1924)
Hysni Curri (?-1925)
Ajet Sopi Bllata 
Agan Koja 
Mehmet Pashë Deralla 
Sali Butka 
Osman Taka 
Asllan Curri 
Idriz Seferi 
Bajram Balota 
Sadik Rama 
Isa Boletini
Jusuf Mehonja

References

Further reading

 
 
 

History of Kosovo
Albanian nationalism
Albanian nationalism in Kosovo
Albanian nationalism in Montenegro
Albanian nationalism in North Macedonia
Albanian culture
Kosovo Albanians
1910s in Yugoslavia
1920s in Yugoslavia
Rebels from the Ottoman Empire
Albanian separatism
Ottoman Albania
Ottoman Serbia
Insurgent groups
History of Sandžak